New Love is the twenty-first studio album by the Japanese rock duo B'z. It was released on May 29, 2019, about a year and a half after their previous album Dinosaur. It is the first B'z album to not have an accompanying single, though music videos were produced for "Tsuwamono, Hashiru", "Wolf", and "Majestic".

The album debuted at number one on the Oricon weekly albums chart and on the Billboard Japan album chart.

The album comes in three editions: A standard CD edition, a vinyl edition, and a limited edition box set featuring the CD with a t-shirt featuring the album art.

"Wolf" was used as the ending theme for the Japanese TV show Suits. "Majestic" was used in a Pocky commercial and "Tsuwamono, Hashiru" was used in commercials for Lipovitan to support the Japan national rugby union team.

Track listing

Personnel 
B'z
 Koshi Inaba – vocals, blues harp on "Deus"
 Tak Matsumoto – guitars

Additional musicians
 Joe Perry – guitar on "Rain & Dream"
 Yukihide "YT" Takiyama – backing vocals on "Deus" and "Majestic"
 Sam Pomanti – backing vocals on "Mr. Armour"
 Brian Tichy – drums on tracks 1, 4, 6-8, 10-13
 Shane Gaalaas – drums on "Tsuwamono, Hashiru"
 Tomu Tamada – drums on "Wolf" and "Majestic"
 Brittany Maccarello – drums on "Rain & Dream" and "Golden Rookie"
 Mohini Dey – bass on tracks 1, 4, 8, 12, 13
 Barry Sparks – bass on "Tsuwamono, Hashiru"
 Seiji Kameda – bass on "Wolf" and "Majestic"
 Robert DeLeo – bass on tracks 6, 7, 9-11
 Jeff Babko – keyboards on tracks 3, 4, 8-12
 Lenny Castro – percussion on tracks 1, 4, 6, 8, 11, 12
 Andy Wolf – saxophone on "Wolf"
 Azusa Tojo – trombone
 Kenichiro Naka – trumpet on "Wolf"
 Mika Hashimoto with Lime Ladies Orchestra – strings on "Da La Da Da"

Production
 Yukihide "YT" Takiyama – arrangement
 Hideyuki Teraji – vocal direction on tracks 1, 4, 6-13, strings arrangement on "Da La Da Da"

Charts

Weekly charts

Year-end charts

Certifications

References 

B'z albums
2019 albums